Jeff Kowatch  is an American painter, born in Los Angeles in 1965.

Works 
Kowatch is an abstract painter. His work is inspired by religion, literature, landscape, and the history of painting, and forms a chronological series of paintings and drawings.

Beginning 
Jeff Kowatch is born in a middle-class American family of Italian, Hungarian and Irish ascent. His family was not very fond of art. Kowatch started painting thanks to his parents' neighbor, who used to paint in her garage. Then, at the age of ten, Kowatch's mother registered him in an oil painting class that took place in an arts and crafts supply shop.

Technique 
Kowatch has developed a glazing technique inspired by the old Flemish masters, especially by Rembrandt, whose medium recipe he has adopted. This gives his paintings a lot of depth. Each of his paintings is composed of up to one hundred layers of oil paint.

The Belgian art critic Roger Pierre Turine sees in him a link between the technique of the old Flemish painters and American painters such as Brice Marden, with whom Kowatch became acquainted with, when he exhibited at the Earl McGrath Gallery, in New York and Los Angeles.

Inspiration and series 
During his childhood in California, Kowatch has been deeply marked by his catholic upbringing. From his late teenage years, he developed a need for spirituality, that he expressed through painting. His early series were thus inspired by religious themes: Apostles (1989-1994), BVM (The Blessed Virgin Mary, 1994–1998), Salome (1998-2002) and Thou Shalt (2003).

His following series were an homage to the old masters, entitled Riffs on Old Masters (2003-2004). He also completed two series inspired by landscapes, Status Mountainous Cumulus (2006-2009) and Ponds (2012-2013).

Literature is also a source of inspiration for Kowatch. Two of his series are entitled Don Quixote (2009-2012) and Moby Dick (2013) respectively, and form a tribute to the heroes’ epic journeys. Kowatch is also inspired by Belgium and has drawn on his own personal adventure in his series Belgium Odyssey (2014).

From 2016, Kowatch has been inspired by the themes of the circus and carnival. He produced his largest painting, Christ Leaving Brussels, in response to James Ensor's The Entry of Christ Into Brussels. This painting has been acquired by the Royal Fine Arts Museums of Belgium in 2018.

In 2018, the Full Circle series pursued the circus and carnival themes. The same year, Galerie La Forest Divonne and Galerie Faider joined forces in Brussels to show two exhibitions of those works. Michel Draguet (Director of the Royal Museums of Fine Arts) talks of passion and ardour, while Claude Lorent writes about art works "monumental, powerful […] expressionist by the graphic strength, tonic and fervent".

From 2020 to 2021, Kowatch develops a series called Man Jok, a reference to his zen buddhism name, which he received after years of practice. Through this series, the painter strengthens the link between his meditative process and his work. Roger Pierre Turine evokes the paintings sonority, serenity and their balance between movement, colours and composition, and the journalist Paloma de Boismorel calls Kowatch a "prophet of colour".

Exhibitions

Solo exhibitions 

 2021
 Man Jok, Galerie La Forest Divonne, Galerie Faider, Espace ODRADEK, Brussels
 2019
 Expo Chicago, Galerie La Forest Divonne, Chicago, Illinois
 Art on Paper, Galerie La Forest Divonne, Brussels
 2018
 Jeff Kowatch, Full Circle, Galerie La Forest Divonne and Galerie Faider, Brussels, Belgium
 Jeff Kowatch, NegenPuntNegen Gallery, Roeselare
 2016
 « Apocalyptic Carnival », Galerie Faider, Brussels, Belgium
 « Schilderijen », NegenPuntNegen Gallery, Roeselare
 « Circus », Galerie La Forest Divonne, Paris
 2015
 « The Belgium Odyssey Paintings », Absolute Art Gallery, Knokke, Belgium
 2014
 « The Belgium Odyssey Paintings» , Galerie Faider, Brussels, Belgium
 « The Belgium Odyssey Paintings» , NegenPuntNegen Gallery, Roeselare, Belgium
 2013
 « ...and out of Chaos came Color » , Galerie Vieille du Temple, Paris
 « Recent Paintings » , Absolute Art Gallery, Knokke, Belgium
 2012
 « New Works », Galerie Faider, Brussels, Belgium
 2011
 « Don Quixote in Vlaanderen », NegenPuntNegen Gallery, Roeselare, Belgium
 « Works on paper », Art on Paper, The White Hotel, Brussels, Belgium
 « Don Quixote in Amsterdam », Muziekgebouw aan ‘t IJ, Amsterdam
 2009
 « Don Quixote part 1 », Galerie Vieille du Temple, Paris
 « Stratus Mountainous Cumulus », NegenPuntNegen Gallery, Roeselare, Belgium
 H.U.B. at the US State Department of Brussels, Belgium
 2006
 « Stratus Mountainous Cumulus », Earl McGrath Gallery, Los Angeles
 2004
 « Untitled », Earl McGrath Gallery, New York
 2003
 « Thou Shalt », Jeff Bailey Gallery, New York
 « Salome Series », Earl McGrath Gallery, Los Angeles
 2001
 « Salome Series », Earl McGrath Gallery, New York
 « Works on paper from the Salomé series », Paul Sharpe Fine Art, New York
 1998
 « BVM Series », Earl McGrath Gallery, New York
 1997
 « Apostles », Union Theological Seminary, New York

Group shows (selection) 

 2019
Art Paris Art Fair, Galerie La Forest Divonne, Paris
2017
 Connected stories, Absolute Art Gallery, Knokke, Belgium
 Geste, Galerie La Forest Divonne, Paris
 « Dialoog / Dialogue » Jeff Kowatch + Pierre Alechinsky + Bram Bogart, Ne9enPuntNe9en Gallery, Roeselare, Belgium
 2016
 Passions partagées, Galerie La Forest Divonne, Bruxelles
 L’Art pour l’Accueil, Galerie Pierre Bergé & Associés, Belgium
 2015
 Pascal Courcelles & Jeff Kowatch, NegenPuntNegen Gallery, Roeselare, Belgium
 Art Paris, Art Fair, Inauguration, Galerie Marie Hélène de La Forest Divonne, Paris
 L’Art pour l’Accueil, Galerie Pierre Bergé & Associés, Belgium
 2014 
 7en14, Galerie Vieille du Temple, Paris
 Summer-Expo, Absolute Art Gallery, Knokke
 2013 
 PAN, Amsterdam, The Netherlands
 Winter-Expo, Absolute Art Gallery, Knokke
 2012 
 Art Paris, Galerie Vieille du Temple, Paris
 2011 
 Papier, Galerie Vieille du Temple, Paris
 L’Art pour l’Accueil, Galerie Pierre Bergé & Associés, Belgium
 2010 
 « Water, Wind, Wandelen », Centrum Ysara, Nieuwpoort, Belgium
 2009 
 « Le dessin à l’œuvre », Galerie Vieille du Temple, Paris
 Art Paris, Galerie Vieille du Temple, Paris
 2008 
 « 20 ans et plus », Galerie Vieille du Temple, Paris
 « Honorons Honoré », De Garage, Mechelen, Belgium
 2005 
 Winter Group Show, Earl McGrath Gallery, New York
 « Work on Paper », Earl McGrath Gallery, Los Angeles
 Spring Group Show, Earl McGrath Gallery, Los Angeles
 « Fall Group Show », Earl McGrath Gallery, New York
 « Untitled », Galerie Kusseneers, Antwerp, Belgium
 2003 
 « Jeff Kowatch and Vincenzo Amato », Earl McGrath Gallery, LA
 Selected Prints, Earl McGrath Gallery, New York
 Summer Group Show, Earl McGrath Gallery, New York
 Winter Group Show, Earl McGrath Gallery, New York
 2000 
 Paul SharpeFine Art, New York,
 « Paper », Earl McGrath Gallery, New York
 Summer Group Show, Earl McGrath Gallery, New York
 1998 
 « Stocking Stuffers », Earl McGrath Gallery, New York
 Summer Group Show, Parts I & II, Earl McGrath Gallery, New York
 1995 
 John Thomas Gallery, Santa Monica, CA
 1994 
 Laguna Art Museum, Laguna Beach, CA
 « 1010 Small Works », New Gallery, Santa Monica, CA
 Robert Art Gallery, LA
 1993 
 « Art in Bloom », Long Beach Museum of Art, LA,
 Los Angeles County Museum of Art, LA
 1992 
 Earl McGrath Gallery, LA
 1990 
 Installation One, LA
 1989 
 Zero One Gallery, LA

Works in public collections 

 Royal Museums of Fine Arts, Belgium
 Long Beach Museum of Art, Long Beach, CA
 Laguna Art Museum, Laguna Beach, CA
 Union Theological Seminary, New York

Articles 
 2021
Roger Pierre Turine, Triplé gagnant pour Jeff Kowatch, Arts Libre, Oct. 2021 (FR)
Paloma de Boismorel, Prophète de la couleur, GAEL Magazine, Oct. 2021 (FR)
Estelle Magalhàes, Jeff Kowatch invite à la méditation, Mu in the city, Sept. 2021 (FR)
Aliénor Debrocq, Jeff Kowatch en plénitude, MAD - Le Soir, Sept. 2021 (FR)
Johan-Frédérik Hel Guedj, Le Brussels Gallery Weekend vous prend par la main, L'Echo, Sept. 2021 (FR)
2020
Aliénor Debrocq, Trilogie estivale, MAD - Le Soir, July 2020 (FR)
2019
Patrick Ogle, Jeff Kowatch, Based in Belgium Went From Copying The Old Masters As A Child To Creating, Unique, Unmistakable Work On Dibond Aluminum Composite, Manapare.us, Nov. 2019
Jean-Marie Wynants, Art on Paper : le dessin n'est plus timide, Le Soir, Oct. 2019 (FR)
2018
Claude Lorent, Le pictural en son incandescence et son intériorité, Arts libre Belgique, Nov 2018 (FR) English version here
Aliénor Debrocq, Sensualité zen, Mad Le soir Belgique, Nov 2018 (FR) English version here
Muriel de Crayencour, Jeff Kowatch, Champignons magiques, Mu in the City, Dec. 2018 (FR)
 2017
Muriel de Crayencour, Jeff Kowatch, Dans l'atelier de Jeff Kowatch, Mu - in the City, March 2017 (FR)
 2016
Muriel de Crayencour, Jeff Kowatch, Carnavals, Mu in the City, nov.24 (FR) English version here
Claude Lorent, La couleur joyeuse pour masquer l’apocalypse, Arts Libres, Nov.4 (FR) English version here
Claude Lorent, En suspension, Arts Libre, Feb.12 (FR) English version here
 2014
 Pascal Goffaut, L’info culturelle, RTBF, Radio interview, Oct. 22
 Claude Lorent, Des tonalités de chez nous, Arts Libre, Sep.19 (FR) English version here
2013
Vincent Delaury, Magazine L'Oeil, Jeff Kowatch, Oct. 2013 
 2012
 Claude Lorent, Peindre toute l’énergie de l’éblouissement, Arts Libre, Sep. 24 2009 (FR) English version here
 Piet Swimberghe, Wolken boven Californië, Knack Weekend, June 3–9
 2005
 Michael Boodro, Designer's Dozen, ELLE Decor US edition, May
 2004
 Piet Swimberghe, Zen aan de Zavel, Knack Weekend, April 7–13
 2003
 Ethical Strokes - Thou Shalt Paint, The New York Sun, November 19
 1998
 Claire Mc Cardell and Friedlander Lee, Art, New York Magazine, October 26
 Ken Johnson, Jeff Kowatch at Earl McGrath, The New York Times, Oct. 23
 1994
 Daniel Cariaga, Music Review : An Ear-Opening ‘Concierto’ at LACMA, Los Angeles Times, July 12

Documentary 

Tout le Baz'art with Jeff Kowatch by Hadja Lahbib, Arte, documentary of 26 min, may 2019 
Jeff Kowatch, Christ leaving Brussels, RTBF Culture, text by Patrick de Lamalle, acquisition by Musées Royaux des Beaux-Arts of Belgium, 2019

Bibliography

PUBLICATIONS 
Grand cru. Gribouillages et griffonnages. 1985-1995, Jeff Kowatch, Collection Alentours, Editions Tandem, 2021, 88 p., text in French.

Conversation with Paul Émond, Jeff Kowatch, Editions Tandem, 2016,  ; text in English and French.

CATALOGUES 
Jeff Kowatch, Full Circle, text by Michel Draguet, edited by Galerie la Forest Divonne and Faider, Nov. 2018, 72 p., text in English and French.

Jeff Kowatch, 2012, texts of Laline Paull, by Audrey Bazin and Melissa Mathison, edited by Earl McGrath Gallery, Galerie Vieille du temple and ne9enpuntne9en, 2009,  ; text in English, Dutch and French.

References

External links 
 Official website
Page of the Royal Fine Arts Museums of Belgium

Artists from Los Angeles
Abstract painters
1965 births
Living people